Proctoporus laudahnae is a species of lizard in the family Gymnophthalmidae. It is endemic to Peru.

References

Proctoporus
Reptiles of Peru
Endemic fauna of Peru
Reptiles described in 2004
Taxa named by Gunther Köhler
Taxa named by Edgar Lehr
Taxobox binomials not recognized by IUCN